Samuel David Burton (December 18, 1887 – June 7, 1933) was an American football and basketball coach. He served as the head football coach at Southwestern Oklahoma State University from 1916 to 1917 and at West Texas State Teachers College—now known as West Texas A&M University–from 1921 to 1924 and 1931 to 1932, compiling a career college football coaching record of 26–37–4. Burton was also the head basketball coach at West Texas State from 1921 to 1933, tallying mark of 210–42. He played college football at the University of Oklahoma in 1910 and 1912.

Head coaching record

Football

References

External links
 

1887 births
1933 deaths
People from Weatherford, Oklahoma
Players of American football from Oklahoma
Oklahoma Sooners football players
Coaches of American football from Oklahoma
Southwestern Oklahoma State Bulldogs football coaches
West Texas A&M Buffaloes football coaches
Basketball coaches from Oklahoma
West Texas A&M Buffaloes basketball coaches
West Texas A&M Buffaloes athletic directors
College track and field coaches in the United States